Tulpehocken Creek may refer to:

Tulpehocken Creek (New Jersey), a tributary of the Wading River in New Jersey
Tulpehocken Creek (Pennsylvania), a tributary of the Schuylkill River in Pennsylvania
Tulpehocken Creek Historic District, a national historic district in Berks County, Pennsylvania

See also